In enzymology, an arginine racemase is an enzyme that catalyzes the chemical reaction

L-arginine  D-arginine

Hence, this enzyme has one substrate, L-arginine, and one product, D-arginine.

This enzyme belongs to the family of isomerases, specifically those racemases and epimerases acting on amino acids and derivatives.  The systematic name of this enzyme class is arginine racemase. This enzyme participates in 3 metabolic pathways: lysine degradation, D-glutamine and D-glutamate metabolism, and D-arginine and D-ornithine metabolism.  It employs one cofactor, pyridoxal phosphate.

References

 

EC 5.1.1
Pyridoxal phosphate enzymes
Enzymes of unknown structure